César Valdez Valenzuela (born December 28, 1964 in San Felipe, Nayarit, Mexico) is a Mexican professional boxer in the Welterweight division. He's also the former Baja California State Welterweight and the Pacific Coast Welterweight Champion.

Pro career
One of César's best wins was an upset knockout over an undefeated Jose Alfredo Flores in Tijuana, Baja California, Mexico.

WBB Light Welterweight Championship
In September 1993, he lost his first title shot to World Boxing Board Light Welterweight champion David Kamau.

On November 29, 1997 Valdez lost to three-time world champion, American Antonio Margarito in Orleans Hotel & Casino, Las Vegas, Nevada.

References

External links

Boxers from Nayarit
Welterweight boxers
1968 births
Living people
Mexican male boxers